Geeta Guru-Murthy is a British television journalist. Since 2013 she has presented mainly morning bulletins, including BBC News at Nine, and bulletins on BBC World News, BBC Two, BBC News Channel and BBC World News.

Early life
Guru-Murthy was born in Liverpool, and grew up in West Bradford, Lancashire close to where her father worked as a radiologist in the local hospitals at Burnley and Blackburn. She was involved with orchestras, theatres and choirs before going on to study biochemistry, and later changing careers.

Career 
Guru-Murthy was a reporter for the BBC's regional news programme, BBC Look North (Yorkshire and North Midlands), before moving to 5 News. In January 1998 Guru-Murthy covered the breaking of the Clinton–Lewinsky scandal from Champaign, Illinois for 5 News. By 2002, Guru-Murthy was hosting Asia Today, with regular work for BBC World, BBC News 24, and BBC Breakfast, and by 2005 presenting the news on BBC Radio 4. In 2002, Guru-Murthy appeared in the television series Waking the Dead.

In 2017 Guru-Murthy was one of several female BBC employees campaigning against the gender pay gap.

On February 2 2023, it was confirmed that Guru-Murthy – alongside many other presenters of the domestic BBC News Channel – would lose their presenting roles as part of the BBC's relaunched news channel.

Personal life
Guru-Murthy married speech-writer and journalist Philip Collins in June 2002, taking a honeymoon in India. Her younger brother, Krishnan Guru-Murthy, is also a journalist and broadcaster for Channel 4 News.

References

External links
 

People from Clitheroe
British people of Indian descent
BBC World News
BBC newsreaders and journalists
British television newsreaders and news presenters
Television presenters from Liverpool
Living people
Year of birth missing (living people)